Glen A. Hanlon (born February 20, 1957) is a Canadian ice hockey coach, executive and former goaltender.

Hanlon played in the National Hockey League for the Vancouver Canucks, St. Louis Blues, New York Rangers and the Detroit Red Wings. He is also former head coach of the Washington Capitals of the NHL, Dinamo Minsk of the Kontinental Hockey League (KHL), the Slovakia national ice hockey team, the Belarusian national ice hockey team and the Swiss national ice hockey team. He was also a goaltender scout for the Vancouver Canucks.

Playing career
Hanlon was drafted by the Vancouver Canucks in the 1977 NHL Entry Draft, in the third round (40th overall pick). He played for the Vancouver Canucks, St. Louis Blues, New York Rangers and Detroit Red Wings in the NHL, as well as the WCHL, Central Hockey League, AHL and IHL.

In 1978, he won the Central Hockey League's Rookie of the Year.

On October 14, 1979, Hanlon allowed the first career NHL goal scored by Wayne Gretzky, who would eventually become the NHL's all-time scoring leader. Hanlon has been quoted as saying "I created a monster" in reference to allowing Gretzky's first goal.

Coaching career
Hanlon has served as the assistant coach for both the Canucks and Washington Capitals before becoming the head coach of the American Hockey League's Portland Pirates and then the Capitals. After a miserable start to the 2003–04 season, Capitals general manager George McPhee fired head coach Bruce Cassidy and promoted assistant Hanlon to head coaching duties. The Capitals went 15–30–9 under Hanlon to finish the year. Led by 2004 first-round pick Alexander Ovechkin, the Capitals were expected to improve; however the team was still young and compiled a record of 29–41–12. Despite this, Hanlon was guaranteed one more year as coach of the Capitals. In 2005, he was assigned to coach the Belarus hockey team. He led the team to 10th place at the 2005 Men's World Ice Hockey Championships, and to historic high sixth place at the 2006 Men's World Ice Hockey Championships. He was named "sports man of the year" by major Belarusian sports newspaper "Прессбол" in 2006. The 2006–07 Capitals compiled an 8–5–4 mark by the end of November, though long losing streaks eliminated the Caps' chances of making the post-season, as they finished 28–40–14.

Over the 2007 offseason, McPhee signed many talented players including Michael Nylander, Tom Poti, Viktor Kozlov and young Swedish star Nicklas Bäckström, elevating expectations in Washington. In the season's first week, the Capitals jumped to a 3–0 record but went on to lose 15 of the next 18 games (3–14–1), which lead to Hanlon's dismissal. McPhee stated that Hanlon had lost control of the team, so he elected to replace Hanlon with Bruce Boudreau, the head coach of the AHL's Hershey Bears. Immediately after Hanlon's exit, the Capitals won against the high-flying Philadelphia Flyers and Carolina Hurricanes. The team finished 37–17–7 the rest of the way in 2007–2008, notching their first division title since 2000–01. Following his dismissal, Hanlon accepted an offer by the Capitals to act as a scout based in the Washington, D.C. area. On February 14, 2008, it was announced that Hanlon would be the head coach of Finnish SM-Liiga team Jokerit.

On March 24, 2010, Glen Hanlon was announced as a new head coach of the Slovak national ice hockey team. He replaced Jan Filc and signed a 4-year contract from April 1, 2010, to the next Winter Olympics in Sochi, Russia, in 2014. Slovakia under his conduct has finished in 12th place on World Championship in Germany 2010. This contract ended prematurely on May 18, 2011, after World Championship in Slovakia where he led the Slovak national ice hockey team to the 10th place.

From 2011 to May 2013, Hanlon was assistant coach of the Vancouver Giants in the Western Hockey League before returning to coach in Europe.

In 2013, Glen returned to coach the Belarus national ice hockey team. He replaced Andrei Skabelka. On May 27, 2014, it was announced that Glen Hanlon signed a two-year contract as new head coach for the Swiss men's national ice hockey team. Hanlon and the Swiss Ice Hockey Federation parted company in October 2015. The parting came by mutual consent due to family reasons.

On May 19, 2016, Hanlon was named general manager of Western Hockey League's Vancouver Giants, the organization he had worked for as an assistant coach earlier in his career. He left the organization after the 2017–18 season.

On June 18, 2018, Hanlon was named the coach of the Hungarian team, DVTK Jegesmedvék.

On May 8, 2020, Hanlon became the head coach of the Krefeld Pinguine in Germany.

Career statistics

Regular season and playoffs

NHL coaching record

SM-Liiga coaching record

Awards and achievements
WCHL First All-Star Team (1976 & 1977)
WCHL Goaltender of the Year (1977)
CHL Rookie of the Year (1978)
CHL First All-Star Team (1978)
"Honoured Member" of the Manitoba Hockey Hall of Fame

References

Related links
 List of NHL head coaches

External links

Profile at hockeydraftcentral.com
Glen Hanlon's biography at Manitoba Hockey Hall of Fame

1957 births
Living people
Adirondack Red Wings players
Brandon Travellers players
Brandon Wheat Kings players
Canadian expatriate sportspeople in Russia
Canadian ice hockey coaches
Canadian ice hockey goaltenders
Dallas Black Hawks players
Detroit Red Wings players
Houston Aeros draft picks
Ice hockey people from Manitoba
New Haven Nighthawks players
New York Rangers players
St. Louis Blues players
San Diego Gulls (IHL) players
Slovakia men's national ice hockey team coaches
Sportspeople from Brandon, Manitoba
Tulsa Oilers (1964–1984) players
Vancouver Canucks coaches
Vancouver Canucks draft picks
Vancouver Canucks players
Washington Capitals coaches
Canadian expatriate sportspeople in Belarus
Canadian expatriate ice hockey players in the United States